The electoral district of Toorak was an electorate of the Victorian Legislative Assembly in the British colony and later Australian state of Victoria.

Electoral boundary
A 1956 map of electoral boundaries shows the Toorak district encompassing the inner Melbourne suburbs of Toorak and South Yarra. The district was bordered by the Yarra River to the north, Kooyong Road to the east, Commercial Road and Malvern Road to the south and St Kilda Road to the east.

Members for Toorak

Election results

References

Former electoral districts of Victoria (Australia)
1889 establishments in Australia
1967 disestablishments in Australia